Jairo Rodríguez (born 18 October 1949) is a former Colombian cyclist. He competed in the 1000m time trial event at the 1972 Summer Olympics.

References

External links
 

1949 births
Living people
Colombian male cyclists
Olympic cyclists of Colombia
Cyclists at the 1972 Summer Olympics
Place of birth missing (living people)